Asclettin (from Old Norse Ásketill) is a masculine Norman given name. It may refer to:
Asclettin, Count of Acerenza (fl. 1016–42), Norman mercenary
Asclettin, Count of Aversa (r. died 1045), son of preceding
Asclettin (Sicilian chancellor), officer serving William I of Sicily